Listed may refer to:

 Listed, Bornholm, a fishing village on the Danish island of Bornholm
 Listed (MMM program), a television show on MuchMoreMusic
 Endangered species in biology
 Listed building, in architecture, designation of a historically significant structure
 Listed company, see listing (finance), a public company whose shares are traded e.g. on a stock exchange
 UL Listed, a certification mark
 A category of Group races in horse racing

See also
 Listing (disambiguation)